Daniel Hale is an American whistleblower and former intelligence analyst.

Daniel or Danny Hale may also refer to:

 Daniel Hale (politician) (died 1821), Secretary of State of New York 1798–1801 and 1810–1811
 Danny Hale (American football) (born 1946), American football player and coach
 Daniel Hale (Prison Break), a character on the American television series Prison Break